Gowin is both a surname and a given name. Notable people with the name include:

Surname:
Emmet Gowin (born 1941), photographer
Jarosław Gowin (born 1961), politician
Toby Gowin (born 1975), footballer

Given name:
Gowin Knight (1713–1772), physicist

See also
Gawain, knight
Gowing